Raymond or Ray Clark may refer to:

Ossie Clark (1942–1996), British fashion designer
Raymond Clark (canoeist) (1924–1990), American canoer who competed in the late 1940s
Raymond Clark (engineer), British engineer
Raymond J. Clark III, convicted for the murder of Annie Le
Ray R. Clark (1877–1926), American politician
Yodelin' Slim Clark (1917–2000), American singer
Ray Clark (baseball), American baseball player
Ray Clark (Paralympic athlete), gold medalist in athletics at the 1972 Summer Paralympics and again in 1976

See also
Ray Clarke (born 1952), English footballer
Ray Clarke (Australian footballer) (1908–1971), Australian rules footballer